Jovan Vojinović (born 10 November 1998) is a Montenegrin professional basketball player Podgorica of the Montenegrin First League and the ABA League Second Division.

Professional career 
Vojinović played the Euroleague Next Generation Tournaments for the Mega Leks U18 (2014–2016). 

In 2016, Vojinović joined Smederevo 1953 for the 2016–17 season. During the 2017–18 season he played for Beovuk 72. In summer 2018, he joined FMP.

In August 2020, Vojinović signed for Sloboda Užice.

National team career
Vojinović was a member of the Montenegro under-18 team that won the gold medal at the 2016 FIBA Europe Under-18 Championship Division B in the Republic of Macedonia. 

He was a member of the Montenegro under-20 team that competed at the 2017 FIBA Europe Under-20 Championship in Greece.

References

External links 
 Profile at eurobasket.com
 Profile at euroleague.net
 Profile at realgm.com
 Profile at ABA League

1998 births
Living people
ABA League players
Basketball League of Serbia players
KK Beovuk 72 players
KK FMP players
KK Metalac Valjevo players
KK Smederevo players
KK Sloboda Užice players
KK Sutjeska players
KK Podgorica players
Montenegrin expatriate basketball people in Serbia
Montenegrin men's basketball players
Point guards
Shooting guards
Serbian expatriate basketball people in Montenegro
Serbian men's basketball players
Sportspeople from Nikšić